Lorenzo Vismara (born 10 August 1975 in Saronno, Varese) is an Italian freestyle sprinter. He achieved many European-level medals in 50 m freestyle, 100 m freestyle and 4 × 100 m freestyle relay events. He participated for Italy in the Summer Olympics of Sydney 2000 and Athens 2004.

He has been the unchallenged Italian champion in sprint freestyle events for nearly ten years, succeeding René Gusperti.

References
 Lorenza Vismara on agendadiana.com
 Lorenza Vismara on Italian Swimming Federation's website  
 Lorenzo Vismara on nuotopedia.eu 

1975 births
Living people
Sportspeople from the Province of Varese
Italian male freestyle swimmers
Olympic swimmers of Italy
Swimmers at the 2000 Summer Olympics
Swimmers at the 2004 Summer Olympics
European Aquatics Championships medalists in swimming
Mediterranean Games gold medalists for Italy
Swimmers at the 1997 Mediterranean Games
Universiade medalists in swimming
Goodwill Games medalists in swimming
Mediterranean Games medalists in swimming
Universiade silver medalists for Italy
Medalists at the 1997 Summer Universiade
Competitors at the 1998 Goodwill Games